Morrison Facilities Services was a United Kingdom-based company that specialised in providing facilities services to private businesses and central and local government bodies. The core area of the business was repair and maintenance of social housing. It was a subsidiary of Anglian Water Group until acquired by Mears Group in 2012.

History
Morrison Construction was founded by the Morrison family in 1948 in Tain, Scotland. In the 1980s, 80% of the company was sold to Charter Consolidated, with the Morrison family retaining 20% of the ownership. In 1989, the Morrison family repurchased the 80% of the business sold to Charter Consolidated earlier that decade, and also acquired the businesses of Biggs Wall and Shand Construction. In 1994, Morrison Construction plc was listed on the London Stock Exchange. 

In 2000, Morrison Construction was purchased by AWG Plc (Morrison Construction was delisted). In 2006, the construction division of the business was sold to Galliford Try. The remainder of the business was split into two divisions, Morrison Facilities Services and Morrison Utilities Services, and in 2008, AWG sold the Utility Services division to two private equity firms, Cognetas and Englefield Capital, for £235 million.

In 2012, AWG sold Morrison Facilities Services to Mears Group for £24 million. The following year, Mears claimed it had successfully turned the company's fortunes around.

References

Business services companies established in 2006
Companies based in Stevenage
2006 establishments in England
British companies established in 2006
Business services companies disestablished in the 21st century